Dorothy Dyne Steel (21 April 1884 – 22 January 1965), commonly referred to as D. D. Steel, was an English croquet player.

Steel dominated English croquet in the 1920s and 1930s, winning the Best 10 competition six times (1922, 1923, 1931, 1933, 1934, 1937), the Open Championship four times (1925, 1933, 1935 and 1936) and the Women's Championship fifteen times (1919, 1922, 1925, 1926, 1927, 1929, 1930, 1932, 1933, 1934, 1935, 1936, 1937, 1938, 1939).

She represented England in three MacRobertson Shield tournaments, winning on two occasions.

In 2011, Steel was inducted into the World Croquet Federation Hall of Fame.

Career statistics 

The Champion Cup was won outright by Miss Steel in 1933 and was replaced by the President's Cup. Until 1938 ten players played in the event. Since then eight have played.

References

1884 births
1965 deaths
English croquet players
Sportspeople from South Yorkshire